Catullus is a crater on Mercury.  Its name was adopted by the International Astronomical Union (IAU) on December 19, 2012. Catullus is named for the Roman poet Catullus.

There is a depression near the center of the crater.  Such depressions in similar craters (for example Glinka, Gibran, or Picasso) are thought to be caused by volcanism.

Hollows are present in Catullus, near the central peak complex.

To the northeast of Catullus is the large crater Praxiteles.

References

Impact craters on Mercury